The National Exchange Hotel (also known as the National Hotel) is located in Nevada City in the U.S. state of California. Listed on the National Register of Historic Places and a California Historical Landmark, it is one of the oldest continuously operated hotels west of the Rockies. It opened in August 1856 under the name of "Bicknell Block".

In 1863, there was a fire and the hotel was shut down for a temporary period of time. By 1894, a new balcony had been added to the hotel (pictured). At a civic affair in San Francisco a Nevada City businessman, John J. Jackson, claimed that a meeting that took place in 1898 at the National Hotel was the creation of the Pacific Gas and Electric Company. In 2012, the hotel was the subject of an episode of Ghost Adventures.

See also
National Register of Historic Places listings in Nevada County, California
California Historical Landmarks in Nevada County

References

External links
 National Hotel website

Hotels in California
Buildings and structures in Nevada City, California
History of Nevada City, California
Hotel buildings completed in 1856
Hotels established in 1856
California Historical Landmarks
Hotel buildings on the National Register of Historic Places in California
National Register of Historic Places in Nevada County, California
Victorian architecture in California
Individually listed contributing properties to historic districts on the National Register in California
1856 establishments in California